Almost Blue is a 2000 Italian thriller film directed by Alex Infascelli.

Cast 
Lorenza Indovina as Grazia Negro
Andrea Di Stefano as Vittorio Poletto
Claudio Santamaria as Simone Martini
Dario D'Ambrosi as Matera
Rolando Ravello as Alessio Crotti
Regina Orioli as Lorenza
 as mother of Simone
Luciano Curreli as Raul Crotti
Angelica di Maio as Vera
Marco Giallini as Sarrina
Alex Infascelli as Luther Blissett
Marisa Solinas as widow Lazzaroni

References

External links

2000 films
2000 thriller films
Italian thriller films
Films directed by Alex Infascelli
2000 directorial debut films
Films based on Italian novels
Films with screenplays by Sergio Donati
2000s Italian-language films
2000s Italian films
]